The 1895 Syracuse Athletic Association football team was an American football team that represented the Syracuse Athletic Association as an independent during the 1895 football season.  The team compiled a 1–5 record and was outscored by its opponents by a total of 116 to 22.

Schedule

References

Syracuse Athletic Association
Athletic Club football teams and seasons
Syracuse Athletic Association football